

Lesley Cunliffe (née Hume; 21 May 1945 – 28 March 1997), also Lesley Hume Cunliffe, was an American journalist and writer.

Biography
Cunliffe was born Lesley Hume in Springfield, Massachusetts in 1945, the daughter of Patricia Spooner and Robert Hume, an air force officer. Her career in journalism started working in television as assistant to reporter Gabe Pressman of NBC News. After relocating to England she was asked to become an editor for Harper's & Queen. She collaborated with Craig Brown on articles, some of which resulted in books: The Dirty Bits (1981) and The Book of Royal Lists (1983). During that period Cunliff also wrote other works, notably My passport to France (1985). She held several editorial positions at Tatler and the American- and English Vogue before becoming a freelance journalist for The Times Literary Supplement, Daily Telegraph, Sunday Times, Sunday Telegraph and Evening Standard.

Personal
In 1971 Lesley married British scholar Marcus Cunliffe. They separated in 1979. After the divorce she dated Stan Gebler Davies, a fellow journalist. Lesley Cunliffe was well liked because of her 'joi de vivre'. According to Mary Killen who wrote her biography in The Independent:

She died in 1997 of stomach cancer at the age of 51.

Publications
 1975 – Burke's Presidential families of the United States of America (Burke's Peerage)
 1981 – The Dirty Bits (Deutsch)
 1983 – The Book of Royal Lists (Simon & Schuster)
 1985 – My Passport to France (HarperCollins Publishers)
 1986 – Great Royal Disasters (Book Club Associates)
 1990 – The Book of Royal Trivia (Bounty Books)

References

External links
 

1945 births
1997 deaths
American women journalists
Deaths from stomach cancer
American magazine editors
Women magazine editors
The Sunday Times people
20th-century American journalists
Deaths from cancer in England
20th-century American women